Lucas Jakubczyk (born 28 April 1985) is a German athlete who competes in the sprint and long jump with a personal best time of 10.07 seconds at the 100 metres event.

Jakubczyk won silver medals at the 2012 European Athletics Championships in Helsinki and 2014 European Athletics Championships in Zurich in the 4×100 metres relay.

External links

 

1985 births
Living people
People from Plauen
German male sprinters
German male long jumpers
German national athletics champions
Olympic athletes of Germany
Athletes (track and field) at the 2012 Summer Olympics
Athletes (track and field) at the 2016 Summer Olympics
European Athletics Championships medalists
Sportspeople from Saxony